The frilled tree frog, rough-armed tree frog, or Southeast Asian tree frog (Kurixalus appendiculatus) is a species of frog in the family Rhacophoridae found in Brunei, Cambodia, India, Indonesia, Malaysia, Myanmar, the Philippines, Thailand, and Vietnam.
Its natural habitats are subtropical or tropical moist lowland forest, subtropical or tropical swamps, subtropical or tropical moist shrubland, rivers, swamps, freshwater marshes, and intermittent freshwater marshes.
It is threatened by habitat loss.

References

External links
 
 Sound recordings of Frilled tree frog at BioAcoustica

Gallery

appendiculatus
Frogs of Asia
Frogs of India
Amphibians of Myanmar
Amphibians of Cambodia
Amphibians of Indonesia
Amphibians of Malaysia
Amphibians of the Philippines
Amphibians of Thailand
Amphibians of Vietnam
Amphibians of Borneo
Fauna of Brunei
Fauna of Sumatra
Amphibians described in 1858
Taxa named by Albert Günther
Taxonomy articles created by Polbot